Rangifer was a small constellation between the constellations of Cassiopeia and Camelopardalis.  It was also known as Tarandus. Both words mean "reindeer" in Latin.  "Rangifer" is the generic name of the reindeer, and "tarandus" is the specific name.

History 
The constellation Rangifer was created by the French astronomer Pierre Charles Le Monnier in 1736 to commemorate the expedition of Maupertuis to Lapland. Geodetical observations from the expedition proved Earth's oblateness.  The constellation is no longer in use.

External links
 Rangifer, the reindeer: Ian Ridpath's Star Tales
 Tarandus vel Rangifer, the reindeer: Shane Horvatin

Former constellations
1736 in France